Hood Stories is the fifth album released by rap group, Dirty. It was released on August 16, 2005 through Rap-a-Lot Records, Asylum Records, Atlantic Records and featured production from DaClub Bangaz, Mike Dean and Maximillion. Hood Stories peaked at #186 on the Billboard 200 and #26 on the Top R&B/Hip-Hop Albums.

Track listing
"Alabama (Stand Up)"- 4:38  
"Choppin"- 7:45  
"Stop Lyin'"- 4:24  
"Git Cha Handz Off Me"- 3:29  
"Moma I'ma Soldier"- 4:13  
"Pray 4 Me"- 3:38  
"I'ma Gangsta"- 3:30  
"What It Is?"- 3:21  
"Let's Ride"- 3:58  
"Silky Pimp Cutta"- 3:48  
"Rolie Polie"- 4:16 (Featuring Bun B) 
"Bring da Hood Back"- 2:56  
"Behind Ya Duke"- 2:57  
"Sunshine"- 3:06  
"Sometimes"- 4:30  
"Just a Little Bit Mo"- 4:26

2005 albums
Albums produced by Mike Dean (record producer)
Dirty (group) albums
Rap-A-Lot Records albums